ShareCAD or ShareCAD.org is a free online service aimed at viewing different DWG and CAD formats as well as 3D models in a web browser.  The service doesn't require any installation or registration and enables users to view vector, raster, and 3D formats online. ShareCAD also offers its users a free iframe plugin for viewing DWG at a site.

The service runs in web browsers powered by Windows, OS X, Linux, Android, iOS, and Windows Phone and is available in the following languages: English, German, French, Italian, Spanish, Portuguese, and Russian.

Features
ShareCAD enables users to view CAD drawings in web browsers online without installation of any desktop software. The service not only displays drawings but also offers such features as access to layers, zooming, 3D orbit etc. To view drawings in more details, the user can change the background color (black or white background). Moreover, the drawing can be printed out. The link for the uploaded drawing remains valid for 24 hours.

The maximum file size is 50 MB. ShareCAD also has free optional registration which allows its users to store their uploaded files on the server.

Supported formats
CAD formats: AutoCAD DWG, DXF, DWF, HP-GL, PLT
Vector formats: PDF, SVG, CGM, EMF, WMF
3D formats: STEP, STP, IGES, IGS, BREP, STL, SAT (ACIS)
Raster formats: PNG, BMP, JPG, GIF, TIFF, TGA, CAL
Archives: 7z, RAR, CAB, ZIP, BZIP, TAR

Free IFrame plugin
ShareCAD also offers its users a free iframe plugin for DWG viewing at a site. The required code with the link to the file is added to a website where DWG or other CAD files should be viewed and users have their drawings displayed there with the help of the plugin.

See also
 DWG
 CAD
 ABViewer, a program for work with DWG, DXF, and other CAD files

References

External links
 Official Website
 Official Developer's Site

Computer-aided design
Computer file formats